Erla Steina Arnardóttir (born 16 May 1983) is a retired Icelandic footballer who last played for Swedish Damallsvenskan club Kristianstads DFF. Erla Steina was part of Iceland's national team and competed in UEFA Women's Euro 2009. She played one season in the W-League with Jersey Sky Blue.

References

"F17/83-landslaget 2000"

1983 births
Living people
Erla Steina Arnardottir
Erla Steina Arnardottir
Kristianstads DFF players
Damallsvenskan players
Sunnanå SK players
Expatriate women's footballers in Sweden
Mallbackens IF players
USL W-League (1995–2015) players
Erla Steina Arnardottir
Erla Steina Arnardottir
Erla Steina Arnardottir
Expatriate women's soccer players in the United States
Women's association football midfielders